Rahamatou Dramé (born 1 April 1985) is an athlete who competed for Mali at the 2012 Summer Olympics in Women's 100m Hurdles.

References 

1985 births
Living people
Malian female hurdlers
Olympic athletes of Mali
Athletes (track and field) at the 2012 Summer Olympics
21st-century Malian people